Stanisław Leszczycki (8 May 1907, in Mielec – 17 June 1996, in Warsaw) was a Polish geographer.

He was a professor at the University of Warsaw since 1948 and the Polish Academy of Sciences since 1952 (in each of them he created an Institute of Geography). He was President of the International Geographical Union in 1968–1972, as well as a member of many learned societies and the author of 200 scientific publications on various subdisciplines.

References
Encyklopedia PWN

1907 births
1996 deaths
People from Mielec
People from the Kingdom of Galicia and Lodomeria
Polish Socialist Party politicians
Polish United Workers' Party members
Members of the State National Council
Members of the Polish Sejm 1947–1952
Polish geographers
Academic staff of the Polish Academy of Sciences
Presidents of the International Geographical Union
Jagiellonian University alumni
Academic staff of Jagiellonian University
Academic staff of the University of Warsaw
Sachsenhausen concentration camp survivors
Commanders of the Order of Polonia Restituta
Recipients of the Order of the White Lion
20th-century geographers